Jose Luccioni (1 August 1949 – 2 June 2022) was a French actor and artistic director. Primarily active in dubbing, he was notably the French voice of Al Pacino from 1985 to 2021. He also directed dubbing in numerous films, television series, and telefilms.

Biography

Family
José was the son of baritone Jacques Luccioni, who himself was the son of tenor José Luccioni (1903–1978). His mother was actress Micheline Luccioni. His daughter, Olivia, is also an actress and artistic director.

Dubbing
Here, he would commence his career in dubbing and voice acting. He dubbed characters of John Travolta in Carrie (1976) and Richard Gere in Looking for Mr. Goodbar (1977). He also dubbed in the series Candy Candy (1978), Once Upon a Time... Space (1982), and The Mysterious Cities of Gold (1982).

In the 1980s, he dubbed numerous horror films, such as Cannibal Holocaust (1980), The Funhouse (1981), Friday the 13th Part 2 (1981), The Howling (1981), Creepshow (1982), and A Nightmare on Elm Street (1984).

Others he regularly dubbed included Joe Mantegna, Harvey Keitel, and Edward James Olmos. In addition, he lent his voice to several video game series, such as Gears of War (2006–2019), Uncharted (2007–2016), Watch Dogs (2014–2020), and Overwatch (2016).

Jose Luccioni died on 2 June 2022 at the age of 72.

Filmography

Cinema
 (1972)
 (1973)
Like a Pot of Strawberries (1974)
Catherine & Co. (1975)
 (1979)
 (1979)
 (1982)
Danton (1983)

Television
Au théâtre ce soir (1976)
 (1981)
Le Mystère des sources du Nil (2003; voice-over)

Music
 (2018)
 (2021)

References

External links
 
 

1949 births
2022 deaths
20th-century French male actors
21st-century French male actors
French male film actors
French television actors
French stage actors
French people of Corsican descent